Williams Township is one of sixteen townships in Calhoun County, Iowa, United States.  As of the 2000 census, its population was 178.

History
Williams Township was created in 1870. It was originally intended to name the township "Three Williams" after its founders, William Stott, William Bush, and William Kennedy, but when the township was organized the "three" was omitted.

Geography
According to the USGS, it contains one cemetery, Saint John.

References

External links
 City-Data.com

Townships in Calhoun County, Iowa
Townships in Iowa